USS Conyngham may refer to one of these United States Navy ships named in honor of Gustavus Conyngham:

, a  destroyer, commissioned in 1936, served in World War II and decommissioned in 1946
, a  guided missile destroyer, commissioned in 1963 and decommissioned in 1990

United States Navy ship names